The Protomen Present: A Night of Queen is a live tribute album by indie rock band The Protomen. On December 10, 2010, the band, along with Evil Bebos and Devin Bowie, performed a tribute show at Exit/In in Nashville, Tennessee in honor of Black Sabbath and Queen. The cover art is based on the album cover of Queen II. Though it was slated for a June 1 release, the album shipped early to those who pre-ordered it.

Track listing

References

2010 albums
The Protomen albums
Queen (band) tribute albums